Dmitry Vladimirovich Kamenshchik (born 26 April 1968) is a Russian businessman, chairman of Moscow Domodedovo Airport, the sole shareholder in Moscow Domodedovo Airport, owner of DME Ltd., the Airport holding company.

According to Forbes, as of August 2022, he is #52 among the richest Russian businessmen, with a net worth of $1.7 billion.

Biography

Kamenshchik was born in Sverdlovsk (Yekaterinburg, Russia), in a family of radiophysisists. His parents met at the Urals Polytechnic Institute (UPI), currently Ural State Technical University. His father managed a computer center at Uralgiprotrans, and so did his mother at a classified geodesy and mapping company.

After school he entered the Faculty of Physics and Energy Engineering at the Moscow Power Engineering Institute

From 1986 to 1988 he was drafted to the regular military service in armored forces of Soviet Army.

In 1990 he entered the philosophy faculty of the Moscow State University, but later decided to leave to embark on his unsatisfied ambitious business plans. However, he did not give up studying; in 2000 he graduated from the Sociological Faculty of the Moscow State University with a major in Economic Sociology. In 2003 he received a PhD degree in Economics from Moscow State University.

On 18 February 2016 Kamenshchik was arrested in connection with the Domodedovo International Airport bombing of 24 January 2011. He was accused of criminal negligence, causing the death of 37 people. Kamenshchik and Domodedovo Airport denied any wrongdoing, stating that the airport security at the time of the accident fully complied with the legal requirements of that time. After the court hearings, Kamenshchik was put under house arrest until 18 April 2016. He was forbidden to leave his house, communicate with anybody except the investigators and relatives, and to use mail, internet or email. Later, on 1 July 2016, due to the intervention of Deputy Prosecutor General Vladimir Malinovsky, Kamenshchik was released from house arrest.

Business 

In February 1991, a businessman from Ekaterinburg Anton Bakov registered JV East Line to engage in air transportation services. That is when Dmitry Kamenshchik, became the general representative of the newly created JV in Moscow.

In 1992, JV East Line stopped operating. Kamenshchik saw it as a chance to become East Line brand owner and continue the air transportation business.

Starting from 1993 East Line leased aircraft and launched charter flights to Europe and Asia. Kamenshchik created a similarly-named airline progressively beefing up its own aircraft fleet and making it to the leaders of air cargo market.

In 1994 East Line company set up its core business at the premises of Domodedovo Airport: catering service, cargo operations, handling, etc. In a quid-pro-quo arrangement the Airport provided outworn plant and equipment, whereas East Line ran reconstruction of airport facilities  and revamped its management system.

The year 1998 was a true game-changer for Kamenshchik. It was when all the previous frenetic activity started paying off for his company - and him personally. East Line managed to strike a 75-year Lease for the Domodedovo airdrome complex not subject to private ownership (runways, taxiways, aircraft parking stands), thus getting the right to operate it on a long-term basis.

The above deals for the transfer of lease and ownership rights were subject to state scrutiny. Since 2004 the Federal Agency for State Property Management (Rosimuschestvo) tried to challenge the granting of such rights to East Line at court, but in 2006-2008 the Presidium of the Supreme Arbitration Court upheld the legitimacy of the deals by three rulings.

To improve the airport’s connectivity, in 2002 Kamenshchik also tried to flirt with the machinery industry as he saw pockets of value in this market, which was then experiencing a certain shortage of electric trains. The result was that his company purchased a 98.19% block of Demikhovskiy Machinery Factory. To add to this spree, Transmash, a project office for transport engineering, was set up and two big purchases were made - Tsentrosvar Factory and Oktyabrskiy Electric Car Repair Factory. In 2004 East Line sold both its own airline company and machinery assets at a profit, as Kamenshchik decided to take his foot off this non-core business pedal and focus on the airport business.

The management system introduced by Kamenshchik made Domodedovo Airport number one in Russia in terms of passenger traffic since 2005; the airport was listed among Europe's major airports in 2011.

After the terrorist attack at Domodedovo Airport in January 2011 law enforcement authorities tried to determine ultimate owners of the Airport.

In the same year during the run-up for the IPO the holding company published information about the final beneficiary at the London Stock Exchange website and specified Kamenshchik as its sole owner. However, the IPO was postponed due to the unfavourable current market environment.

In September 2013 it was officially announced  on the Airport’s website that the Chairman of the Board of Directors of Moscow Domodedovo Airport Dmitry Kamenshchik was its ultimate owner.

To buttress its airport business DME Ltd., Kamenshchik’s holding company, develops the second arm, an aviation-driven Aerotropolis. The core idea is to create a synergetic conurbation around the Airport which will be a massive industrial cluster integrating business parks, logistic and transport hubs, shopping malls, industrial centers and hotel resorts.

Assets assessment 
The analysis of public data on the transactions involving purchase of the airport controlling stakes in the last three years (Tolmachevo  in 2011, 
Edinburgh  in 2012, and  Stansted in 2013) suggests that the EV/LTM EBITDA average multiplier came to a factor of 17.2.  Application of this multiplier to Domodedovo leads to an estimated value of the airport at approx. USD 7.5 billion.

Family and hobbies

Kamenshchik is single. 
His hobbies include jet piloting, shangi martial art, diving, kiting and mountain skiing.

References 

Businesspeople from Yekaterinburg
1968 births
Living people
Moscow State University alumni
Russian billionaires